Palmerston North Hospital is the main public hospital in Palmerston North, New Zealand. It is the main hospital run by the MidCentral District Health Board, which primarily serves Palmerston North and the surrounding Manawatu, Tararua and Horowhenua districts.

The hospital has 354 inpatient beds as of 2020. The hospital is a major trauma centre, one of four in the lower North Island alongside Hawke's Bay Hospital, Whanganui Hospital and Wellington Regional Hospital.

History
The hospital first opened on 27 November 1893 with 25 inpatient beds across four wards, and was staffed by two doctors and three nurses. Ellen Dougherty was the hospital's first matron; on 10 January 1902, she became the world's first registered nurse after the New Zealand Parliament passed the Nurses Registration Act 1901.

In 1968, a 20-year-old male died during an operation at the hospital in New Zealand's first recorded case of malignant hyperthermia (MH), a genetic disorder which causes a severe reaction in susceptible person when exposed to certain anaesthetic agents. It was subsequently discovered the deceased man was part of a large family based in the Manawatū region that had carried the gene for many generations. As a result, around one in every 200 surgeries at Palmerston North Hospital involves a MH-susceptible patient, compared to between 1:10,000 and 1:250,000 worldwide. New Zealand's first (and only) MH testing centre was set up at Massey University in 1978, and was taken over the hospital's anaesthetic department in 1986.

References

External links 

 

Buildings and structures in Palmerston North
Hospitals established in 1893
Hospitals in New Zealand
1893 establishments in New Zealand